XHLIA-FM is a radio station on 93.1 FM in Morelia, Michoacán. It is owned by Radio S.A. and carries its Grupera grupera format.

History
XELIA-AM 1140 received its concession on February 24, 1993. It was owned by Radiorama and broadcast as a 250-watt daytimer. Quiñones acquired the station in 2012.

XELIA was cleared to move to FM in 2012. Originally slated for 103.3 MHz, XHLIA-FM was moved to 93.1 MHz in September 2013, and the next year the IFT awarded a new station, XHMICH-FM, on 103.3 instead. An additional modification, allowing for the station to move to a mountain site, was approved in 2017.

References

Radio stations in Michoacán